Majid Jordan is the debut studio album by Canadian R&B duo Majid Jordan, it was released on February 5, 2016, by OVO Sound and Warner Bros. Records. The album serves as a follow-up to their debut EP A Place Like This (2014). The album's sole guest appearance comes from Drake, who they have previously worked with on his single "Hold On, We're Going Home" in 2013.

Singles

On July 10, 2015, the first single "My Love", which features Drake was premiered on Beats 1 radio station, it was released after on the iTunes Store and Apple Music. On September 1, 2015, the music video was released for "My Love".

On November 30, 2015, the second single "Something About You" was premiered on Power 106 radio station, it was released digitally four days later along with the pre-order of the album on the iTunes Store and Apple Music. The music video was released later that month on December 22, 2015.

Track listing

Notes
  signifies a co-producer.
  signifies a vocal producer.
 "Something About You" features background vocals by Snoh Aalegra.

Personnel
Majid Jordan
 Majid Al-Maskati – vocals
 Jordan Ullman – instrumentation

Additional personnel
 Illangelo – instrumentation (1, 3, 9)
 Nineteen85 – instrumentation (3, 11)
 Noah "40" Shebib – instrumentation (3)
 Noel Cadastre – instrumentation (3)
 Sno Aallegra – backing vocals (9)
 Joseph Patrick Gonsalves – guitar (9)

Technical
 Chris Athens – mastering
 Noah "40" Shebib – mixing (all tracks); engineering (3)
 Noel "Gadget" Campbell – mixing (all tracks); engineering (3)
 Travis Sewchan – engineering, recording (1, 2, 4–8, 10–12); engineering assistance (3)
 Illangelo – engineering, recording (9)
 Christer George – additional engineering (3)
 Les Bateman – mixing assistance (3)
 Gregg Moffet – engineering assistance (3)

Charts

Release history

References

External links
 

2016 debut albums
Albums produced by Illangelo
Albums produced by Majid Jordan
Albums produced by Nineteen85
Albums produced by Noah "40" Shebib
Majid Jordan albums
OVO Sound albums
Warner Records albums